Chyvarloe is a hamlet in the parish of Gunwalloe, Cornwall, England.

References

Hamlets in Cornwall